Manasseh Cutler (May 13, 1742 – July 28, 1823) was an American Congregational clergyman involved in the American Revolutionary War. He was influential in the passage of the Northwest Ordinance of 1787 and wrote the section prohibiting slavery in the Northwest Territory. Cutler was also a member of the United States House of Representatives. Cutler is "rightly entitled to be called 'The Father of Ohio University.'"

Biography

Cutler was born in Killingly in the Connecticut Colony. In 1765, he graduated from Yale College and after being a school teacher in Dedham and a merchant – and occasionally appearing in court as a lawyer – he decided to enter the ministry. He married Mary Balch within a year of graduating from Yale. Mary's sister, Hannah, married Jabez Chickering, making Cutler the uncle of their son, also named Jabez Chickering. Cutler studied under Mary's father, Thomas Balch, the minister at Dedham's Second Parish Church, for the ministry. From 1771 until his death, he was pastor of the Congregational church in what was the parish of Ipswich, Massachusetts until 1793, now Hamilton. For a few months in 1776, he was chaplain to the 11th Massachusetts Regiment commanded by Colonel Ebenezer Francis, raised for the defense of Boston. In 1778, he became chaplain to General Jonathan Titcomb's brigade and took part in General John Sullivan's expedition to Rhode Island. Soon after his return from this expedition he trained in medicine to supplement the scanty income of a minister. In 1782, he established a private boarding school, directing it for nearly a quarter of a century. In 1784 a geological party, headed by Manasseh Cutler, named the highest peak in the northeast Mount Washington. 

In 1786, Cutler became interested in the settlement of western lands by American pioneers to the Northwest Territory. On March 1, 1786, Cutler attended a meeting at the Bunch of Grapes Tavern with Putnam,  Benjamin Tupper, and Samuel Holden Parsons to form the Ohio Company of Associates, which led to a contract being drawn up, later approved by the Confederation Congress, that sold about five percent of what was to become the State of Ohio to this group of Revolutionary War Veterans. Provisions of the contract included setting aside two townships in the center of the purchase for a university; these "College Lands" are in Appalachia. The following year, as agent of the Ohio Company of Associates that he had been involved in creating, he organized a contract with Congress whereby his associates (former soldiers of the Revolutionary War) might purchase one and a half million acres (6,000 km2) of land at the mouth of the Muskingum River with their Certificate of Indebtedness.  During the Continental Congress, Cutler took a leading part in drafting the famous Northwest Ordinance of 1787 for the government of the Northwest Territory, particularly its prohibitions regarding slavery in the new territories, which was finally presented to Congress by Massachusetts delegate Nathan Dane.  In order to smooth passage of the Northwest Ordinance, Cutler influenced and won the votes of key congressmen by making them partners in his land company .  By changing the office of provisional governor from an elected to an appointed position, Cutler was able to offer the position to the president of Congress, Arthur St. Clair.

Cutler was friends with Benjamin Franklin, and kept detailed notes during the Constitutional Convention about his visits to Franklin's Philadelphia, Pennsylvania residence and the wonders Franklin kept there.  From 1801 to 1805, Cutler was a Federalist representative in Congress. Cutler was elected a Fellow of the American Academy of Arts and Sciences in 1781. Besides being proficient in the theology, law and medicine of his day, he conducted painstaking astronomical and meteorological investigations and was one of the first Americans to conduct significant botanical research. He is considered a founder of Ohio University and the National Historic Landmark Cutler Hall on that campus is named in his honor. In 1785, Cutler was elected a member of the American Philosophical Society. He received the degree of Doctor of Laws from Yale University in 1789. Manasseh was elected a member of the American Antiquarian Society in 1813. Cutler died in 1823 at Hamilton, Massachusetts.
Three of his descendants were members of the U.S. Congress-and one vice president:
William P. Cutler [1812-1889] son of Ephraim Cutler
Rufus Dawes [1838-1899] father of Vice President Charles Gates Dawes and Beman Gates Dawes; he was the son of Mrs. Sarah (Cutler) Dawes daughter of Ephraim Cutler
Beman Gates Dawes [1870-1953] son of Congressman Rufus Dawes

See also
Ephraim Cutler
William P. Cutler
Manasseh Cutler Hall
History of Ohio University

References

External links

 

1742 births
1823 deaths
Clergy in the American Revolution
Fellows of the American Academy of Arts and Sciences
Members of the American Antiquarian Society
People of Massachusetts in the American Revolution
Ohio University people
Yale Law School alumni
People from Killingly, Connecticut
Federalist Party members of the United States House of Representatives from Massachusetts
People of colonial Connecticut
University and college founders
Clergy from Dedham, Massachusetts
Politicians from Dedham, Massachusetts
People from colonial Dedham, Massachusetts